Vitaly Rudnitsky (born 29 November 1974) is a Belarusian gymnast. He competed at the 1996 Summer Olympics and the 2000 Summer Olympics.

References

External links
 

1974 births
Living people
Belarusian male artistic gymnasts
Olympic gymnasts of Belarus
Gymnasts at the 1996 Summer Olympics
Gymnasts at the 2000 Summer Olympics
People from Mogilev
Sportspeople from Mogilev Region